Tripidium ravennae, synonym Saccharum ravennae (and many others), with the common names ravennagrass and elephant grass, is a species of grass in the genus Tripidium. It is native to Southern Europe, Western Asia and South Asia. It is known in North America as an introduced species, where it is sometimes an invasive and troublesome noxious weed.

Uses
Ravennagrass is a large, aggressive grass that has been sold in nurseries for use as an ornamental grass in gardens, and for stabilizing soil to prevent erosion. It is sold under the name "hardy pampas grass."

Invasive species
Tripidium ravennae is now established as an invasive species in several parts of North America, including Glen Canyon National Recreation Area in Utah, the Rio Grande Valley State Park in Albuquerque, New Mexico, and parts of California. It grows in the moist soil of riparian habitats including marshes and riverbanks.

This perennial grass grows in large, dense clumps from a network of rhizomes. It produces erect stems which can reach 13 ft (4m) in height. The serrated leaves are up to a meter long. The inflorescence is a plume-like panicle of spikelets covered in white or pale-colored silky hairs.

References

External links
 Grass Manual Treatment of Saccharum ravennae
 Jepson Manual Treatment – invasive plant species.

Andropogoneae
Flora of Europe
Flora of Western Asia
Garden plants of Asia
Garden plants of Europe
Plants described in 1774
Taxa named by Carl Linnaeus